Eduardo Vélez defeated Javier Sánchez in the final, 6–3, 7–5 to win the boys' singles tennis title at the 1986 Wimbledon Championships.

Seeds

 n/a
  Christian Weis (third round)
  Javier Sánchez (final)
  Eduardo Vélez (champion)
  Shane Barr (third round)
  Zeeshan Ali (semifinals)
  Alberto Mancini (third round)
  Nuno Marques (quarterfinals)
 n/a
  Patrick Flynn (first round)
 n/a
  Tomás Carbonell (semifinals)
  Alain Lemaitre (second round)
  Stéphane Grenier (first round)
  Eugenio Rossi (third round)
 n/a

Draw

Finals

Top half

Section 1

Section 2

Bottom half

Section 3

Section 4

References

External links

Boys' Singles
Wimbledon Championship by year – Boys' singles